Matheus Coradini Vivian (born 5 April 1982) is a Brazilian former professional footballer. He also holds an Italian passport.

Club career
Vivian was born in Caçapava do Sul, Rio Grande do Sul, Brazil. He started his professional at Grêmio. He was signed by Eintracht Frankfurt on 9 July 2002. He then return to Brazil to play for Botafogo de Futebol e Regatas on loan, and signed by Las Palmas in January 2004. He then moved to Ceuta in summer 2004, and then back to Botafogo on 22 February 2005. But on 25 August 2005, he was signed by Grenoble Foot 38 of Ligue 2.

After seven years in France, Ligue 1 and Ligue 2, he signed for PAOK FC a two-year deal in August 2012 as a free agent.

In January 2013, his contract was terminated. He joined Ligue 2 side En Avant de Guingamp in January 2013 on a 1 and a half year contract.

International career
He won 1999 FIFA U-17 World Championship with Brazil.

External links
 Brazilian FA Database 
 
 

1982 births
Living people
Sportspeople from Rio Grande do Sul
Brazilian footballers
Brazil youth international footballers
Brazilian expatriate footballers
Expatriate footballers in France
Expatriate footballers in Germany
Expatriate footballers in Greece
Association football defenders
AD Ceuta footballers
Botafogo de Futebol e Regatas players
Eintracht Frankfurt players
Grêmio Foot-Ball Porto Alegrense players
Grenoble Foot 38 players
UD Las Palmas players
FC Metz players
FC Nantes players
PAOK FC players
En Avant Guingamp players
2. Bundesliga players
FC Sochaux-Montbéliard players
Segunda División players
Segunda División B players
Ligue 1 players
Ligue 2 players
Super League Greece players
Brazilian people of Italian descent